Ada Derana Sri Lankan of the Year (Sinhala:අද දෙරණ වසරේ ශ්‍රී ලාංකිකයා), is an annual award presented to Sri Lankans who have raised Sri Lanka's profile in the international arena through their careers and lifted the name Sri Lanka globally. The awards are presented by the Sri Lankan television channel, TV Derana. 
The awards were established in 2016 and are presented in a number of categories including arts, sports and civil servants.

2016 Awards
 
Sports – Matthew Abeysinghe (swimming)
Global Entertainer - Jacqueline Fernandez (film actress)
Entrepreneur - W. K. H. Wegapitiya
Classical Entertainer - Arunthathy Sri Ranganathan
Entertainer / Popular Category - Bathiya and Santhush (music)
Global Businessman - Merrill Joseph Fernando
Global Scientist - Malik Peiris
Popular Award – Kumar Sangakkara (cricket)
Special Award - Jayanthi Kuru-Utumpala (mountain climbing)
Public Service – Mahinda Deshapriya 
Unsung Hero - Ajith C. S. Perera/ Princy Mangalika/ Wilbert Ranasinghe
Gallant Soldier –  Personnel Representing the Tri-Forces
ICON of the Year – Kumar Sangakkara

2017 Awards 
 
2nd awards ceremony.
Sports – Dinesh Priyantha (Paralympic javelin throw)
Entertainer Classical Category – Ravibandu Vidyapathi (dancing)
Entertainment Distinguished Achievement – Iranganie Serasinghe (cinema)
Entrepreneur - Aban Pestonjee 
Global Businessman – Mahesh Amalean (MAS Holdings)
Global Scientist – Chandra Wickramasinghe (astrobiology)
Global Entertainer – Rohan de Silva (music)
Global Professional – Cecil Balmond
Popular Category –  Chamara Weerasinghe (music)
Public Service – Gamini Wijesinghe 
Unsung Hero – Lily Violet/ Thilini Nadeeka Shalwin 
Bravery Award – Naveen Danushka/ Nihal Sarath Kumara/ Eranga Wikumsiri
Lifetime Achievement – Lester James Peries (cinema)
ICON of the Year – Muttiah Muralitharan (cricket)

2018 Awards 

3rd awards ceremony.
Sports – Dilantha Malagamuwa (motor racing) / Anusha Koddithuwakku (boxing)
Entertainer Classical Category – Rohana Weerasinghe (music)
Entertainment Distinguished Achievement – Channa Wijewardena (dancing)
Entrepreneur - M.G Kularatne (MAGA Engineering) 
Global Businessman – Ashroff Omar (Brandix)
Global Scientist – Prof. Gehan Amaratunga (physics)
Emerging Global Scientist – Asha de Vos (marine biology)
Global Entertainer – Alston Koch (music) / B. H. Abdul Hameed (media)
Global Professional – Ranjan Madugalle (cricket)
Global Inventor – Bandula Wijay (doctor)
Special Honorary Award - Johann Peries (hiking) / Col. Rathnapriya Bandu (military) / Sri Lanka national netball team
Public Service – Samantha Gunasekara (conservationist) 
Unsung Hero – Martin Wijesinghe 
Bravery Award – Sergeant Dilan Sampath (police) / Keerthi Bandara Padmasiri (driver) / Tharindu Weerasinghe & Sachintha Lakshan
Lifetime Achievement – Vajira Chitrasena (dancing)

References

Sri Lankan awards
2016 establishments in Sri Lanka
Awards established in 2016
Entertainment in Sri Lanka